is a greatest hits album of the character Kirari Tsukishima from the Japanese anime Kirarin Revolution.

Background and release

Best Kirari is a greatest hits album of the character Kirari Tsukishima from Kirarin Revolution. The album compiles all opening and ending theme songs she performed for Kirarin Revolution, including songs performed with Mai Hagiwara from Cute as Kira Pika and songs with Sayaka Kitahara and You Kikkawa from Hello Pro Egg as MilkyWay.

The album was released on March 11, 2009 under the Zetima label. The limited edition featured an alternate cover and exclusive DVD. The regular edition came with an original sticker as its first press bonus.

Reception

The album debuted at #18 in the Oricon Weekly Albums Chart and charted for five weeks.

Track listing

Charts

References

External links
 Best Kirari at Up-Front Works

2009 greatest hits albums
Anime soundtracks
Kirarin Revolution
Hello! Project albums
Television soundtracks